Hyde-White is a surname. Notable people with the surname include:

 Alex Hyde-White (born 1959), British-born American actor
 Wilfrid Hyde-White (1903–1991), English actor

See also
Hyde (surname)
White (surname)

Compound surnames
English-language surnames
Surnames of English origin